Amizade is a 2018 Indian Konkani-language action film written and directed by Aniket Arun Naik, and produced by Sachin Verlekar's Om Creative Film Works, in partnership with Bymistake Motion Pictures. It stars Konkani actors John D’Silva and Rajiv Hede and is the debut film of Siddhant Kanekar,  Gaurav Pokle, Chetan Upadhay, Dhruv Sincro and Vaishnavi Pilankar. The film is about love and the journey of four good friends and their friendship. The film's trailer was launched at the Goa Marathi Film Festival in 2018, and its poster was released at the 48th International Film Festival of India by the then Chief Minister of Goa Manohar Parrikar. The film was released on 7 December 2018.

Cast
 John D’Silva as Bebo
 Siddhant Kanekar as Abhi
 Gaurav Pokle as Siddhu
 Dhruv Sincro as Ghodo
 Vaishnavi Pilankar as Suzy
 Rajiv Hede as D'Souza, the ruthless politician
 Chetan Upadhay as Alwin D'Souza, the politician's brother

Production
Aniket Naik has been working in Mumbai's film industry since 2007, working on films like Ferrari Ki Sawaari, John Day, Hridayanath, many advertisements, and has even worked as the second assistant director for the Hollywood film Hidden. Making a Konkani film with this prior experience in filmmaking was thus a long time dream of his. Working on the script for nearly two years, he collaborated with producer Sachin Verlekar to make the film. Naik chose many amateur debutantes for the film and got them trained further before beginning the filming. The music for this movie is given by the music director duo Rithesh-Shridhar.

See also
 Konkani cinema
 Juze

References

External links
 
 

2018 films
Films set in Goa
Films shot in Goa
2010s Konkani-language films